Priscocamelus is an extinct monospecific genus of camelid, endemic to North America. Fossils have been found only at two sites in the Rio Grande valley of Texas.

References

Prehistoric camelids
Oligocene even-toed ungulates
Miocene even-toed ungulates
Aquitanian genus extinctions
Cenozoic mammals of North America
Chattian genus extinctions
Prehistoric even-toed ungulate genera